Jan Morávek (born 1 November 1989) is a Czech footballer who plays as an attacking midfielder for Bohemians 1905 and the Czech Republic national team.

Career

Club career
Morávek began his career 1995 with Bohemians 1905 and was promoted to the first team in 2006, playing his debut on 8 June 2007 against 1. HFK Olomouc. He played his first game for Bohemians 1905 in the Czech First League on 12 November 2007 against Sparta Prague.

After a successful tryout with German club Schalke 04 in November 2008, he signed a four-year contract on 24 March 2009. He joined the club on 1 July 2009 for a fee of €2.5 million. In summer 2010, Schalke loaned Morávek to 1. FC Kaiserslautern until the end of the season. After half a season back with Schalke, he signed a six-month loan with FC Augsburg in January 2012.

International
Morávek played six matches and scored two goals for the Czech Republic U18 national team. He was a member of the Czech Republic U21 national team where he has played nine matches.

On 3 March 2010, Morávek made his debut for the senior side of his country in the 0–1 loss against Scotland in a friendly match after coming on as a substitute for Jaroslav Plašil in the second half of the game.

Career statistics

Honours

Club
Schalke 04
 DFL-Supercup: 2011

International
Czech Republic U21 
UEFA European Under-21 Championship bronze: 2011

References

External links
 
 Jan Morávek at  Idnes 
 

1989 births
Living people
Footballers from Prague
Czech footballers
Czech Republic international footballers
Czech Republic under-21 international footballers
Czech Republic youth international footballers
Association football midfielders
Czech First League players
Bundesliga players
Regionalliga players
Bohemians 1905 players
FC Schalke 04 players
FC Schalke 04 II players
1. FC Kaiserslautern players
FC Augsburg players
FC Augsburg II players
Czech expatriate footballers
Expatriate footballers in Germany
Czech expatriate sportspeople in Germany
Czech National Football League players